Martina Noseková (born ) is a Slovak female volleyball player, playing as an opposite. She was part of the Slovakia women's national volleyball team. She competed at the 2009 Women's European Volleyball Championship.

References

External links
  profile at CEV
  profile at legavolleyfemminile

1985 births
Living people
Slovak women's volleyball players
Olympiacos Women's Volleyball players
Place of birth missing (living people)